The South Moravian Region is an administrative unit of the Czech Republic, located in the south-western part of its historical region of Moravia (an exception is Jobova Lhota which traditionally belongs to Bohemia). The region's capital is Brno, the nation's 2nd largest city. South Moravia is bordered by the South Bohemian Region (west), Vysočina Region (north-west), Pardubice Region (north), Olomouc Region (north east), Zlín Region (east), Trenčín and Trnava Regions, Slovakia (south east) and Lower Austria, Austria (south).

Administrative divisions
The South Moravian Region is divided into 7 districts (Czech: okres):

There are in total 673 municipalities in the region, of which 49 have the status of towns. There are 21 municipalities with extended powers and 34 municipalities with a delegated municipal office.

The region is famous for its wine production. The area around the towns of Mikulov, Znojmo, Velké Pavlovice along with the Slovácko region provide 94% of the Czech Republic's vineyards.

Population
The region has approximately 1,188,000 inhabitants. The net migration has been positive in all years since 2003, reaching its peak in 2007 when it reached 7,374 people. Since 2007 the region has also experienced natural population growth. In 2012 there were 37 thousand foreigners living in the region, forming 3.2% of the total population of the region.

The average age of citizens in the region was 42.4 years in 2019. The average age has grown by 5 years over the last two decades. The life expectancy at birth in 2012 was 75.2 years for men and 81.7 years for women. Life expectancy has been growing over recent years. The divorce-marriage ratio in the region was 60.3 in 2012.

One third of the region's population lives in the capital Brno. The share of inhabitants living in towns and cities on the total population of the region has been steadily decreasing due to suburbanization. The table below displays 12 municipalities with the highest number of inhabitants in the region (as of 1 January 2019):

Geography 
With an area of 7,187.8 km2 the South Moravian Region is the fourth largest region of the Czech Republic. The highest point of the region is located in the eastern part on Durda mountain (842 m). The point with the lowest elevation (150 m) is situated in Břeclav District at the meeting of the rivers Morava and Dyje.

The northern and north-western part of the region is covered by the Bohemian-Moravian Highlands (Czech: Českomoravská vrchovina) and the Moravian Karst. There is an extensive cave complex in the Moravian Karst with a 138.5 m depth in the Macocha Gorge in the Punkva Caves. In the eastern part, the region reaches to the Carpathian Mountains. The Bohemian-Moravian Highlands and the Carpathian Mountains are separated by the Lower-Moravian Valley (Czech: Dolnomoravský úval). The southern part of the region is predominantly flat and dominated by fields, meadows, and the remainders of riparian forests.

The largest river of the region is the Morava river. Other significant rivers are the Dyje, Svratka (and its tributary the Svitava), which are all tributaries of the Morava river. The whole region belongs to the drainage basin of the Danube and subsequently of the Black Sea.

There are a number of landscape parks (Czech: chráněná krajinná oblast) located across the region: the White Carpathians Landscape Park, the Moravian Karst Landscape Park and Pálava Landscape Park. Moreover, Podyjí National Park is situated in the south-eastern part of the region.

Major events

2021 tornado 

On the evening of 24 June 2021, a large IF4 tornado, the most powerful in modern Czech history, devastated multiple villages within the Břeclav and Hodonín districts. It killed at least 6 people and injured at least 200 others. The tornado tracked 27.1 kilometers (16.8 miles) with a max width of 2.8 kilometers (1.7 miles) This tornado was one of seven that touched down in Europe that day. It is estimated that this tornado caused over 15 billion CZK in damages. A total of 1,202 buildings were damaged by the tornado, 180 of which had to be demolished completely or partially. Well constructed homes were partly or entirely destroyed, including one that indicated IF5 intensity. However, a rather weak connection between the roof and the walls was
found, which prevented the damage to be assigned an IF5 rating. Cars were mangled distances and into buildings. A car was thrown 200 meters into a field, with the engine found 150 meters away. Trucks, trailers, busses and other large vehicles were overturned or tossed. pylon of 400 kV power lines were toppled. Trees were uprooted, snapped, debranched and debarked. A factory in Lužice was heavily damaged with multiple vehicles mangled into the building. Some trees at the factory sustained severe denuding. Empty large containers were thrown and a solar farm was severely damaged. In Hodonín, a large and multi-story building found at the northern edge of the town had Its roof and interior significantly damaged. Wooden and steel beams from the roof were found impaled into the ground around the buildings and bent by the wind. Large concrete floor tiles were plucked out of the ground and thrown away. In Mikulčice, A bus with several passengers inside was thrown over a small hill, impacting a one-storey brick home. large concrete panels measuring 3 x 1 x 0.1 m were moved several meters. In hrusky, a caravan weighing 7 tonnes was tossed 20 meters away, flying over a garage. Several heavy trailers and tractors as well as large concrete blocks from a hay storing structure were lifted and thrown by the tornado.

Living conditions
In 2016, three-quarters of households in the region had a computer and 75% of the households had Internet connection. There were in total 781 thousand motor vehicles, of which 482 thousand were cars and 110 thousand were motorbikes.

The unemployment rate in the region was 4.3% as of October 2017.

Economy
The nominal gross domestic product of the South Moravian Region was 671.259 billion CZK in 2021, which is nearly 11% of the national GDP. Among other regions, South Moravian Region had the third largest share on the national GDP out of fourteen. The GDP per capita was 562.278 CZK (23.428 EUR) in the same period, which is 98.5% of the national average and the second highest result after region Prague.
 Industry

Mechanical engineering has an essential role in the economy of the region. Important centers of mechanical engineering are Brno (PBS, Siemens, Zetor Brno), Blansko (ČKD Blansko, Metra Blansko), Kuřim (TOS Kuřim), Boskovice (Minerva, Novibra) and Břeclav (OTIS). Electrical engineering has a tradition for more than a century. Significant producers are Siemens Drásov, VUES Brno and ZPA Brno.  Food industry forms another important sector, especially in the southern and eastern part of the region. Important activities are the meat processing, canning of fruits and vegetables (Znojmia, Fruta), sugar industry, brewing (Starobrno, Černá Hora, Vyškov and Hostan) and winemaking (Lahofer, Znovín Znojmo
, Vinium Velké Pavlovice). Chemical and pharmaceutical industry is concentrated especially in Brno (Pliva-Lachema), Ivanovice na Hané (Bioveta) and Veverská Bítýška (Hartmann Rico).
 Transport
The South-Moravian Region has an important role in the nation and international transit. It is served by a network of motorways and roads of almost 4,500 km. The motorways D1 and D2 and the expressways R43 and R52 form the skeleton of the road network in the region. Brno is an important crossing of road and railway transport and a hub of the integrated regional public transport system.

Brno has an international airport Brno–Tuřany. The airport was opened in 1954 and in 2012 it served 535 thousand passengers.
 Agriculture
The agricultural land covers 426 thousand ha, which is 59.3% of all land in the regions. The arable land occupies 49% of the total area. Znojmo District and Vyškov District have the highest proportion of arable land in the region. The agricultural production is oriented on the production of cereals, rapeseed and sugar beet. Other important agricultural sectors in the region are viticulture, fruit farming and vegetable growing. The viticulture is especially developed in Břeclav District, which has 46% of the total area of Czech vineyards.

Places of interest 
 Brno with Cathedral of St. Peter and Paul, Villa Tugendhat, Capuchin Crypt, etc.
 Dolní Věstonice archeological site
 Lednice-Valtice - inscribed in UNESCO World Heritage List
 Macocha Gorge
 Automobile and motorbike races at Masaryk Circuit 
 Podyjí National Park
 Slavkov u Brna (Austerlitz) - a town well known for the Battle of Austerlitz
 Vranov nad Dyjí and its castle 
 White Carpathians biosphere reservation

Photo gallery

See also
Moravian wine

References

External links 
  Official website
  South Moravian Region
 Znojmo City official web site

 
Regions of the Czech Republic